Bulgarian-Chinese relations are foreign relations between Bulgaria and China. Both countries established diplomatic relations on October 4, 1949. Bulgaria has an embassy in Beijing, China. China has an embassy in Sofia, Bulgaria.

See also 
 Foreign relations of Bulgaria
 Foreign relations of China
 Chinese people in Bulgaria
 China–European Union relations

References

External links
  Bulgarian embassy in Beijing
  Chinese Ministry of Foreign Affairs about relations with Bulgaria
   Chinese embassy in Sofia

 

 
China
Bilateral relations of China